Newton Booth (December 30, 1825July 14, 1892) was an American entrepreneur and politician.

Early life 
Born to Hannah (née Pitts) of North Carolina and Beebe Booth of Connecticut, Quakers, in Salem, Indiana, he attended the common schools. In 1841, his parents Beebe and Hannah Booth moved from Salem to Terre Haute, Indiana. In 1846, he graduated from Asbury College (later renamed DePauw University), in nearby Greencastle, Indiana. He studied law in Terre Haute, was admitted to the bar in 1849, and became a partner in Griswold's law firm.

Career

Terre Haute 
Booth worked in his father’s Terre Haute store, then studied law in the office of attorney William Dickson Griswold (1815-1896). Booth traveled with Walter W. Reynolds, from Terre Haute, by ship to Panama, continuing, by ship to San Francisco, arriving 1850-10-18.

California 
Central Pacific Railroad founder, Lucius Anson Booth (1820-1906), a cousin, and New York native, and Thomas Morton Lindley, Sr. (1819-1896), in 1849, began the firm of Lindley & Booth. When Newton Booth arrived in Sacramento, the first cholera epidemic was spreading, and he went to Amador County, where he was sick for some time. The epidemic, reportedly, ended in three weeks. In May 1850, John Forshee, Lucius Anson Booth and John Dye established Forshee, Booth & Co. In the Spring of 1851, Lucius Anson Booth and John Dye retired from Forshee, Booth & Co. In February, 1851, Charles Smith and Newton Booth established a business of Smith & Booth., on J Street, between 4th and 5th streets. Kleinhaus & Co., established in 1852, Theodore P. and David W. Kleinhaus as partners.

The firms suffered from the Sacramento Fire of 2 November 1852. Soon after Lucius Anson Booth, one of the organizers of Lindley & Booth, became a partner, and the firm assumed the name of Booth & Co. and continued until 1856, when Newton Booth retired and returned to Indiana, while the firm consolidated with Kleinhans & Co., but the name was not changed from Booth & Co. In 1856, C. T. Wheeler and T. L. Barker were admitted as partners. The Kleinhaus retired in 1860, and Newton Booth again entered the firm. Lucius Anson Booth and T. L. Barker retired in 1862, and Joseph Terry Glover (1832-1886), of San Francisco, became a partner in the firm. In 1869, Lucius Anson Booth was working in SF and living in Oakland. In December, 1871, business was established in San Francisco in connection with W. W. Dodge. The firm in 1878 was composed of Newton Booth, C. T. Wheeler, Joseph Terry Glover and W. W. Dodge.

Newton Booth made his fortune as a saloon keeper.

Terre Haute 
He returned to Terre Haute in 1856 and engaged in the practice of law with future U.S. Congressman Harvey D. Scott.  In the summer of 1857 Booth traveled through Europe.

California 
In 1860, he returned to Sacramento, campaigned for Abraham Lincoln for president, and returned to the wholesale mercantile business.

In 1862, he  was on Leland Stanford's (1824-1893) gubernatorial inauguration ball general committee.

In 1862, Booth was elected to the California State Senate, serving in 1863.

From 1863 to 1866 Booth was a resident of San Francisco.

From 1867 to 1892, Booth lived in Sacramento, on Front Street, between J and K streets.

In the 1871 California gubernatorial election, Booth became the eleventh governor of California, from December 8, 1871, to February 27, 1875. Booth openly sought black support.

Booth was later elected to the United States Senate, resigning his governorship.

U.S. Senate 
In 1873, Booth helped to organize the Dolly Vardens political party, and with their support he was elected as an Anti-Monopoly Party member, serving as a Senator from March 4, 1875, to March 3, 1881. He was not a candidate for reelection in 1880. During his time in the Senate, he served as chairman of the U.S. Senate Committee on Manufacturers and the U.S. Senate Committee on Patents, both during the 45th Congress. In 1876, the Greenback Party nominated him for Vice President of the United States on the ticket with Peter Cooper. However, Booth declined the nomination and Samuel F. Cary replaced him. As of 2021, Booth remains the only senator from California who served as a member of a third party.

California 
After serving in Congress, he returned to his wholesale mercantile business in Sacramento.

Personal life 
He married the widow of Joseph Terry Glover, his business partner, Octavine C. Glover (1833-1907) on 9 February 1892, in Sacramento, where he died, in July 1892. His wife, Octavine C. Booth (1833-1907), Glover’s mother-in-law, Eliza Payne (1810-1873); his sister-in-law, Julia E. Dunn (1839-1923); and his brother-in-law, William Henry Payne (1848-1919); are interred in the Newton Booth plot in Sacramento Historic City Cemetery.

He was the uncle of author Booth Tarkington, son of his sister Elizabeth Booth, who was raised in Terre Haute.

Recognition
 Sacramento's Newton Booth neighborhood was named for him.
 Native Sons of the Golden West historical plaque in front of the Booth Company wholesale grocery Building 1017 Front Street in Old Sacramento.

Dolly Vardens (political party) 
The Dolly Vardens was a new, independent, republican, Anti-Monopoly political party. The party was named for a calico pattern composed of many different colors and figures, alluding to a political party made up of "sore heads from any party or by any name".

Further reading
 Sobel, Robert, and John Raimo, eds. Biographical Directory of the Governors of the United States, 1789-1978, Vol. 1, Westport, Conn.: Meckler Books, 1978. 4 vols.
 Melendy and Gilbert. The Governors of California: From Peter H. Burnett to Edmund G. Brown, Talisman Press, 1965
 Governors of California 1849-2002  California State Assembly
 Schaechtele. The Governors of California and their Portraits, California State Capitol Museum Volunteer Association, 1995
 Tinkham. California Men and Events: Time 1769 – 1890, Record Publishing, 1915
 FLASHES FROM THE WIRES. Los Angeles Times; Feb 10, 1892

References

External links
 

 Newton Booth < California Governors < Social Studies Fact Cards < Califa library consortium
Newton Booth Biography at californiagovernors.ca.gov
 Newton Booth Biography at the California State Library 
 
 
 
 

|-

|-

|-

1825 births
1892 deaths
Anti-Monopoly Party United States senators
Booth Tarkington
Republican Party California state senators
DePauw University alumni
Republican Party governors of California
United States senators from California
19th-century American politicians